Synodus gibbsi is a species of lizardfish that lives mainly in the Indian Ocean. It is found in a marine demersal environment. This species is native to a tropical climate.  Synodus gibbsi is recorded to not serve as any threat to humans.

References

 

Synodontidae
Fish described in 1981